Catocala streckeri is a moth of the family Erebidae. It is found in the Russian Far East (Amur, Khabarovsk, Primorye, Sakhalin, Southern Kuriles), Korea, China and Japan (Hokkaido, Honshu, Shikoku).

The wingspan is about 52 mm.

References

External links
Catocala of Asia

streckeri
Moths of Asia
Moths described in 1888